|}

The Foxhunters' Open Hunters' Chase is a National Hunt steeplechase in Great Britain for amateur riders which is open to horses aged six years or older. 
It is run at Aintree over a distance of about 2 miles and 5 furlongs (2 miles, 5 furlongs and 19 yards, or ), and it is scheduled to take place each year in April.

The Foxhunters' is one of only three races run over the Grand National fences at the Aintree Festival, the other two races being the Topham Chase and the Grand National itself. The race is currently sponsored by Randox Laboratories.

The race was originally run over the full Grand National distance.

Records
Most successful horse since 1946 (3 wins):
 Credit Call – 1972, 1975, 1976

Leading jockey since 1946 (3 wins):
 Sam Waley-Cohen – Katarino (2005, 2006), Warne (2014)

Leading trainer since 1946 (4 wins):
 Arthur Stephenson – Sea Knight (1963, 1965), Credit Call (1972, 1975)

Winners
 All amateur jockeys.

See also
Horse racing in Great Britain
List of British National Hunt races

References

Racing Post
,

External links
 Race Recordings 

Aintree Racecourse
National Hunt chases
National Hunt races in Great Britain